The Indochinese grey langur (Trachypithecus crepusculus) is a species of lutung native to East and Southeast Asia.

Taxonomy 
It was formerly considered conspecific with Phayre's leaf monkey (T. phayrei), but a 2009 study found it to be a distinct species and the most basal member of the T. obscurus lineage, which contains several other species. Later studies have also found it to be a hybrid species originating from ancient hybridization between ancestral obscurus-group langurs and the Tenasserim lutung (T. barbei).

Distribution 
This species is found throughout Indochina, from northern Thailand east to Vietnam and west to eastern Myanmar, and ranges north to southern China south of the Salween River.

Habitat and ecology 
Unlike langurs that live in karst forests, which have a largely terrestrial lifestyle, the Indochinese grey langur inhabits old-growth evergreen forests and has a largely arboreal lifestyle.

Threats 
This species' population is only thought to have about 2,400 to 2,500 mature individuals. It is threatened by habitat destruction and, especially in Vietnam and Laos, hunting, the latter of which is thought to have led to rapid declines in the species.

References 

Indochinese grey langur
Primates of Southeast Asia
Primates of East Asia
Mammals of Myanmar
Mammals of Laos
Mammals of Thailand
Mammals of Vietnam
Mammals of China
Endangered fauna of Asia
Indochinese grey langur
Taxa named by Daniel Giraud Elliot